Millersburg is a historic railway station located at Millersburg, Dauphin County, Pennsylvania.  It was built in 1898, by the Northern Central Railway.  It is a two-story, brick and frame building in the Queen Anne style.  It features a deep porch around three sides.  The property also includes the stone foundation of the original baggage house.  It was used as a passenger station until 1960.  In 1982, it was acquired by the Historical Society of Millersburg.  It is used as an information center for tourists and visitors and houses offices of the Millersburg Ferry Boat Association and Millersburg Area Chamber of Commerce.

It was added to the National Register of Historic Places in 2002 as Millersburg Passenger Rail Station.

References

External links
Dauphin County Genealogy Resource Center website

Railway stations in the United States opened in 1898
Railway stations on the National Register of Historic Places in Pennsylvania
Queen Anne architecture in Pennsylvania
Transportation buildings and structures in Dauphin County, Pennsylvania
Former Pennsylvania Railroad stations
National Register of Historic Places in Dauphin County, Pennsylvania